Samuel Yves Um Titi (born 14 November 1993), known as Samuel Umtiti, is a French professional footballer who plays as a centre-back for  club Lecce, on loan from La Liga club Barcelona. Born in Cameroon, he represented the France national team. 

Umtiti began his professional career with Lyon in 2012, winning both the Coupe de France and Trophée des Champions in his first year. He totalled 170 games and three goals before a €25 million transfer to La Liga club Barcelona in 2016. He won three Copa del Rey and two La Liga titles at Barcelona.

After winning 47 caps and scoring three goals at youth level, including winning the 2013 U-20 World Cup, Umtiti made his senior debut for France at Euro 2016, where they reached the final. Two years later, he was part of the squad that won the 2018 World Cup. He scored the only goal of the match in the semi-final against Belgium.

Club career

Early years
Umtiti was born in Yaoundé, Cameroon, he moved with his family when he was two-years-old to Villeurbanne, France. A few months later, however, the family settled in the district of Ménival in the 5th arrondissement of Lyon. Thereafter, Umtiti joined the local football club Ménival at the age of five. At nine years old, he joined Lyon's youth academy.

Lyon

Umtiti was included in a Lyon squad for the first time on 16 August 2011, remaining an unused substitute as they defeated Rubin Kazan 3–1 in the first leg of the Champions League play-off round. He made his professional debut for the club on 8 January 2012, playing the whole match in a 3–1 victory over local rivals Lyon-Duchère in the Coupe de France. Six days later, he made his Ligue 1 debut in a 1–0 away defeat to Montpellier, playing the entire game. Umtiti made a total of 18 appearances across all competitions in his debut season.

In the 2012–13 season, he became a more regular member of the Lyon first team. On 12 January 2013, against Troyes in a 2–1 away win, he scored his first career goal. He finished the season with 32 appearances in all competitions and two goals.

Barcelona

On 30 June 2016, Umtiti signed for La Liga side Barcelona for a fee of €25 million. On 17 August, Umtiti made his first appearance for Barcelona in the second leg of the 2016 Supercopa de España which Barcelona won 3–0 versus Sevilla and lifted the trophy. Umtiti picked up a knee injury in September 2016 while in Barcelona training, causing him to miss a crucial La Liga clash against Atlético Madrid. He scored his first goal for the club, on 4 March 2017, against Celta de Vigo with Barcelona winning 5–0 at the Camp Nou. He would later play a vital role in the 2016–17 Champions League round of 16 second leg fixture against Paris Saint-Germain, as he started the match alongside Gerard Piqué and Javier Mascherano in a 3-man central defence partnership. Umtiti assisted his teammates in recovering from a 4–0 first leg deficit to a historic 6–1 victory, the biggest comeback in the history of the Champions League. He would cap off his first year in Spain by winning the 2016–17 Copa del Rey and by establishing himself firmly as first-choice in central defence for the club alongside Piqué.

Now established as first-choice in defence at the club, after Barcelona's subpar 2017 Supercopa de España while reeling off the loss of Neymar, Umtiti began the season with great performances, under the guidance of new manager Ernesto Valverde. On 2 December, Umtiti injured his right hamstring and was ruled out for eight weeks. Umtiti scored the winning goal against Valencia CF at Camp Nou, on 14 April, in a 2–1 victory for the Catalans. A week later, on 21 April, Umtiti started for Barcelona in the 2018 Copa del Rey Final, holding a clean sheet in an eventual 5–0 victory over Sevilla at the Metropolitano Stadium. Additionally, Umtiti won his first La Liga winners' medal during his second season in Spain, with the defender appearing in 40 games and scoring one goal across all competitions.

On 3 June 2018, Umtiti signed a new five-year contract with Barcelona. The release clause was subsequently set at €500 million. Umtiti was named as a substitute for the 2018 Supercopa de España behind Piqué and a new summer signing Clément Lenglet. Despite not featuring and with Barcelona winning the match 2–1 against Sevilla, Umtiti claimed his fifth winners' medal since joining the club.

In 2018, Umtiti picked up a knee injury which could have been treated with surgery, but he instead opted for conservative treatment, and proceeded to play in the 2018 World Cup, which he won with France. However, this choice resulted in the defender spending much of the following season with Barcelona injured.

In August 2020, while recovering from a knee injury, Umtiti tested positive for COVID-19.

Loan to Lecce 
On 25 August 2022, Barcelona announced that they had reached an agreement with newly-promoted Serie A side Lecce on the loan of Umtiti until 30 June 2023, with no purchase option. He then made his debut with the club on 9 October, starting and playing the full 90 minutes in a 2–1 league loss against Roma.

On 4 January 2023, the defender was racially abused, together with his team-mate Lameck Banda, by a group of away supporters during a home league game against Lazio. The Lazio fans involved kept targeting the two players with racist chants throughout most parts of the match, with referee Livio Martinelli being forced to interrupt the game for a few minutes during the second half. The game eventually ended in a 2–1 win for Lecce. Umtiti, who burst into tears after the final whistle and was praised for his performance on the pitch, was defended by Lecce supporters, who had attempted to drown out the abuse with counter-chants of praise for the Frenchman throughout the second half; the club's president himself, Saverio Sticchi Damiani, also stood for both the abused players in the post-match. Lazio apologised for the behaviour of their supporters by issuing an official statement on social media, while FIFA president Gianni Infantino showed support to Umtiti and Banda through a message on his Instagram profile.

International career

Youth
Umtiti was a France youth international, having represented the country from under-17 to under-21 levels. He was an integral member of the team that won France's first ever U-20 World Cup in 2013. Although, he had to sit out the final against Uruguay due to a red card received in the semi-final against Ghana.

Senior

Umtiti was born and spent the first two years of his life in Cameroon. Therefore, the Cameroonian Football Federation and their former international player Roger Milla met his advisors in an unsuccessful attempt to get him to represent their national team.

Umtiti, who was at the time uncapped at senior level, was selected by the France national team manager Didier Deschamps to be part of the France's squad for the European Championship in 2016, following an injury to the compatriot Jérémy Mathieu. Umtiti made his senior debut on 3 July by playing every minute of the quarter-final against Iceland at the Stade de France, replacing the suspended Adil Rami. Thus, he became the first outfield player since Gabriel De Michèle (at the 1966 World Cup) to win his first cap for France by appearing in the finals of a major tournament and was accurate with all 77 of his passes during the match, which France won 5–2. He later earned extremely positive reviews for his performance in the semi-final against the incumbent world champions Germany. This led to a lot of excitement over Umtiti's prospects for his newly signed club, Barcelona, and his future as a player.

On 13 June 2017, Umtiti scored his first goal for France, equalising against England in an eventual 3–2 victory for Les Bleus in a friendly match in Paris.

On 17 May 2018, he was called up to the 23-man France squad for the 2018 World Cup in Russia. In the semi-final against Belgium on 10 July, he scored the only goal of the game, heading in a corner. On 15 July, Umtiti was named as a starter, as France beat Croatia 4–2 in the final.

Style of play
Umtiti is a powerful and rangy left-footed central defender, who is predominantly known for his physical strength, anticipation, pace, ability in the air, and tackling, as well as his distribution, technique, and ability on the ball, which enables him to carry the ball out from the defence, or start attacking plays from the back with his passing. In 2018, ESPN FC journalist Sam Marsden praised Umtiti's reading of the game, timing and risk-taking, adding that he could lead Barcelona's defence for the next five to 10 years.

In the 2017–18 season, Umtiti had suffered several knee and muscle injuries when playing for Barcelona. When the World Cup came, he had been advised by many doctors to take surgery to prevent injuries getting worse and worse, however Umtiti decided to play through the pain instead. Despite winning the World Cup, Umtiti has struggled with many injuries which has deeply affected his career as a result, and he has since been known to be very injury prone.

Career statistics

Club

International 

As of match played 8 June 2019. France score listed first, score column indicates score after each Umtiti goal.

Honours

Lyon
Coupe de France: 2011–12
Trophée des Champions: 2012

Barcelona
La Liga: 2017–18, 2018–19
Copa del Rey: 2016–17, 2017–18, 2020–21
Supercopa de España: 2016, 2018

France U20
FIFA U-20 World Cup: 2013

France
FIFA World Cup: 2018

Individual
UEFA European Under-19 Championship Team of the Tournament: 2012
UEFA Champions League Breakthrough XI: 2016
FIFA FIFPro World XI 2nd team: 2018
FIFA FIFPro World XI 5th team: 2017
 ESM Team of the Year: 2017–18,

Orders
Knight of the Legion of Honour: 2018

References

External links

 Profile at the FC Barcelona website
 
 
 
 
 
 

1993 births
Living people
French sportspeople of Cameroonian descent
Footballers from Yaoundé
Footballers from Lyon
Black French sportspeople
French footballers
Association football defenders
Olympique Lyonnais players
FC Barcelona players
U.S. Lecce players
Ligue 1 players
La Liga players
Serie A players
France youth international footballers
France under-21 international footballers
France international footballers
UEFA Euro 2016 players
2018 FIFA World Cup players
FIFA World Cup-winning players
French expatriate footballers
Expatriate footballers in Spain
Expatriate footballers in Italy
French expatriate sportspeople in Spain
French expatriate sportspeople in Italy
Chevaliers of the Légion d'honneur